Congolese National Olympic and Sports Committee (IOC code: CGO) is the National Olympic Committee representing the Republic of the Congo.

External links 

IOC website

Congo
 
1964 establishments in the Republic of the Congo
Olympic
Sports organizations established in 1964